Northumberland Park station may refer to:
Northumberland Park Metro station, Tyne and Wear, England, United Kingdom
Northumberland Park railway station, London, England, United Kingdom